As Veigas is one of four parishes (administrative divisions) in Taramundi, a municipality within the province and autonomous community of Asturias, in northern Spain.  

Towns 
 Os Armallos
 Os Couces
 El Couso
 Os Esquíos
 A Folgueirosa
 O Navallo
 A Preira
 Santa Mariña
 Os Teixóis
 Turía
 As Veigas

Parishes in Taramundi